A wide variety of cheeses are made throughout the country of Spain.

Some of the Spanish cheeses are internationally renowned, such as the Manchego cheese of La Mancha. Some regions are better known for their cheeses than others; 26 cheeses are classified as Protected Designation of Origin (D.O.P.—Denominación de Origen Protegida) and 3 additional cheeses are classified as Protected Geographical Indication (I.G.P. - Indicación Geográfica Protegida) by Spain and the European Union. Many of the cheeses are manufactured from single types of milk (cow, goat or sheep), but a few are mixtures of different milks, and the milk may be raw, pasteurised or creamy. The cheeses are made in a wide variety of styles including fresh, cured, semi-cured and pressed paste, and some are inoculated with mould to make blue varieties. There is a huge variation in the presentation of cheeses, from the hard, dark-skinned, two-kilo Manchego to the soft, small quesitos. 

A list of Spanish cheeses follows, grouped by an alphabetical ordering of geographic regions.

Andalucía
 Queso de las Alpujarras (P.D.O.)
 Queso de los Pedroches from raw sheep milk, mostly merino of Sierra de Cazorla, goat milk, cow milk and mixtures of all three
 Queso payoyo of Grazalema, in the Sierra de Cádiz
 Quesitos de Zuheros, Córdoba
 Queso de Fuente Palmera Mainly goat milk with Quinkana brand and mixture milk (cow and goat) with brand "La Abuela Valle", near Cordoba, Sierra Morena and Guadalquivir Valley

Aragon
 Queso de Tronchón, which was cited by Cervantes in Don Quixote, and made with sheep milk or mixed with goat milk
 Queso Echo y Ansó
 Queso de Biescas
 Queso Patamulo
 Queso de Radiquero
 Queso de Benabarre
 Queso Pañoleta
 Queso de Sahún
 Queso de El Burgo
 Queso Chistabín

Asturias

 Queso Cabrales (P.D.O.)
 Queso de Afuega el pitu  (P.D.O)
 Queso de Los Beyos
 Queso Casín (P.D.O.)
 Queso de Gamonedo (D.O.)
 Queso de Peñamellera
 Queso de Urbiés
 Queso de La Peral

Balearic Islands

 Formatge de Maó, Menorca.(P.D.O.)
 Formatge Mallorquí (P.D.O.)

Basque Country
 Queso Idiazábal (P.D.O.) shared with Navarre and obtained from Lachen sheep

Canary Islands
 Queso majorero (P.D.O.)
 Queso de flor (P.D.O.)
 Queso palmero (P.D.O.)
 Queso de la Gomera
 Queso de Lanzarote
 Queso herreño

Cantabria
 Picón Bejes-Tresviso (P.D.O.) is very similar to Asturian Cabrales, but also has unique features
 Quesucos de Liébana (P.D.O.)
 Queso Nata de Cantabria (P.D.O.)
 Queso de Áliva, with an aroma similar to smoked beef
 Queso de Brez
 Queso Torta de Potes

Castile–La Mancha
 Queso Manchego (P.D.O.)
 Queso de Oropesa

Castile and León

 Queso zamorano (P.D.O.)
 Queso de Valdeón (P.D.O.)
 Queso pata de mulo
 Queso castellano
 Queso de Burgos
 Queso del Tiétar

Catalonia

 Formatge de l'Alt Urgell i la Cerdanya (P.D.O.)
 Formatge de la Garrotxa
 Serrat (Pyrenees)
 Llenguat (Pallars)
 Mató
 Tou dels Til·lers (Pallars Sobirà)
 Tupí (Pyrenees and Pre-Pyrenees)

Extremadura

 Queso de La Serena, or Torta de La Serena (P.D.O.)
 Queso Ibores (P.D.O.)
 Torta del Casar (P.D.O.)
 Quesaílla
 Queso de Acehúche
 Queso de la Siberia extremeña
 Queso de Gata-Hurdes
 Queso de la Vera

Galicia

 Queso de Tetilla (P.D.O.) made from the milk of the Rubia gallega cow
 Queso Arzúa-Ulloa (P.D.O.)
 Queso Cebreiro (P.D.O.)
 Queso San Simón da Costa

Murcia
 Queso de Murcia al vino (P.D.O.) a cheese made from the pasteurized milk of Murcian goats
 Queso de Murcia (P.D.O.) another cheese made from Murcian goat milk but with characteristics which differ from Queso al Vino

Navarre

 Queso Idiazábal (P.D.O.)
 Queso Roncal (P.D.O.)
 Queso Urbasa, Menhaden sheep milk
 Queso Ribaforada, goat milk
 Queso Cabanillas, goat milk
 Queso Lesaca, cow milk or a mixture with goat milk

Valencian Community
 Queso blanquet
 Queso de la Nucia
 Queso de cazoleta
 Queso de servilleta
 Queso Tronchón

See also

 List of cheeses
 Spanish cuisine

References

External links
 Cheeses of Spain with Designation of Origin - www.queseros.com
Profiles of most popular Spanish cheeses: spanishclub.blog
 Spanish cheese in the world

Cheeses

Spanish cheeses
Cheeses